Tristan Angle-Beaumanoir (March 3, 1828 in Paris – December 6, 1895 at Evran (Côtes d'Armor)) was a French politician.

Before that, he was a naval officer. He became sub-prefect in 1867, first in Cholet and later in Coutances. Relieved by the Government of September 4, 1870, he was appointed prefect of the Cotes-du-Nord by the Conservative government of 16 May 1877 and resigned a few months later. He was a monarchist senator for Côtes-du-Nord from 1885 to 1895 and was often involved in political debates and inquiries. He was known for his sense of humor.

References 
  Jean Jolly (dir.), Dictionnaire des parlementaires français, Presses universitaires de France

French Senators of the Third Republic
French Navy officers
1828 births
1895 deaths
Senators of Côtes-d'Armor